Edgar "Junior" Saffer Jr. (July 27, 1918 – July 6, 1982) was an American professional basketball player. He played in just one game for the Cincinnati Comellos in the National Basketball League during the 1937–38 season.

References

1918 births
1982 deaths
American men's basketball players
Basketball players from Indiana
Cincinnati Comellos players
Forwards (basketball)
People from Wayne County, Indiana
United States Army personnel of World War II